Lieutenant-General Marc J. Dumais, CMM, CD is a former Canadian Forces officer.

Career
Dumais became Commander 1 Canadian Air Division on 2 August 2002 remaining in that post until 3 August 2004 before being appointed Commander of Canada Command on May 19, 2006.

References

External links 
 Canada Command biography
 Department of National Defence - Senior Officer biography
 Canadian Forces biography

|-

Canadian Forces Air Command generals
Year of birth missing (living people)
Living people
Commanders of the Order of Military Merit (Canada)